Cristoforo Savolini (1639–77) was an Italian painter of the Baroque period, active in the region near Pesaro and his native town of Cesena.

A student of the Caravaggio-inspired Cristoforo Serra, he was inspired by Guercino and Guido Cagnacci. One of his patrons was the Cesenese Ludovico Ugolini. He painted the altarpiece of San Donnino in the church of San Domenico in Cesena.

Death
Savolini died from a riding accident at the age of 38.

Sources
Short biography

1639 births
1677 deaths
People from Cesena
17th-century Italian painters
Italian male painters
Italian Baroque painters